Abu Abdallah al-Husayn ibn Ahmad ibn Hamdan al-Hamadhani, better known simply as Ibn Khalawayh (890s, in Hamadan – 980/81) was a 10th-century scholar of Arabic grammar and Quranic exegesis. He was active at the court of Sayf al-Dawla, the Hamdanid ruler of Syria, at Aleppo.

Ibn Khalawayh was a famous scholar during his lifetime, and assembled a circle of disciples in regular literary reunions. He was active in the period of hectic philological activity towards a canonical text of the Qur'an. His grammatical opinions were eclectic, in between the major opposition between the grammatical schools of Basra and Kufa.

Citations

References
 
W. C. Brice, An Historical atlas of Islam, 1981, 
David Larsen, introduction to Ibn Khalawayh's Names of the Lion (Wave Books, 2017), vii-xiv.

Further reading
 

Quranic exegesis scholars
Medieval grammarians of Arabic
Linguists from Iran
Year of birth unknown
980s deaths
People from the Hamdanid emirate of Aleppo
10th-century Arabic poets
Sayf al-Dawla
People from Hamadan